Luke Jackson may refer to:

Arts and entertainment
Luke Jackson (singer), British singer
Luke Jackson, the title character of Cool Hand Luke, portrayed by Paul Newman
Luke Jackson, author of Freaks, Geeks, and Asperger Syndrome

Sports
Luke Jackson (baseball), (born 1991), American baseball player
Luke Jackson (basketball, born 1981), American basketball player in the 2000s
Lucious Jackson (1941–2022), also known as Luke Jackson, American basketball player in the 1960s and 1970s
Luke Jackson (boxer) (born 1985), Australian amateur boxer
Luke Jackson (footballer) (born 2001), Australian rules footballer